Himerometra robustipinna is a species of crinoid belonging to the family Himerometridaem first described as Actinometra robustipinna by Philip Herbert Carpenter in 1881.

Description
Mouth and anus are both on the upper side of the body. Usually this species has reddish or maroon arms, but it may have yellow or pale brown brachials with maroon pinnules. It feeds on detritus, phytoplankton and zooplankton caught by means of a sticky substance on the arms. It can cling onto corals with short appendages called cirri, but it also can freely swim. The larvae of this feather star swim freely with plankton for a few weeks, then they settle down growing into a stalked form. Mature specimen break the stalk becoming free-living.

Distribution
This species is widespread in the western Pacific and in the Indian Ocean, from Bay of Bengal up to China Sea, Great Barrier Reef, Indonesia, Philippines, South Japan.

Habitat
Himerometra robustipinna lives in the coastal waters with a coral reef ecosystem, relatively strong currents, clear water and plankton availability, at a depth of  0 – 57 m.

References

 David J. Lane and Didier Vandenspiegel. 2003. A Guide to Sea Stars and Other Echinoderms of the World. Singapore Science Centre
 Marine Species
 EoL

Himerometridae
Animals described in 1881